An ice cycle, ice bike, or icycle is a bicycle adapted for use on ice, usually by replacing the front wheel with an ice skate. Versions exist with and without additional skates to provide lateral stability, that have been based on upright and recumbent bikes, and that have been used for racing. Ice cycles have been in use since at least the 1890s, and theory predicts that a bicycle with a front skate can exhibit riderless self-stability similar to the same bicycle with a front wheel. At least one example has been made with both the front and the rear wheels replaced by skates.

Gallery

See also
Cold-weather biking
Icetrack cycling
Two-mass-skate bicycle
Skibob

References

Cycle types
Bicycles